Johansfors is a locality situated in Emmaboda Municipality, Kalmar County, Sweden with 409 inhabitants in 2010.

The Johansfors Glasbruk was a long established and well regarded glass maker, now closed.

References

External links 

Populated places in Kalmar County
Populated places in Emmaboda Municipality
Värend